The Conway House is a historic log house in Hamilton, Montana. It was built in 1930 for Grace L. Conway. By the 1980s, it belonged to the Tibbs family.

The house was designed in the American Craftsman style. It has been listed on the National Register of Historic Places since August 26, 1988.

References

Log houses in the United States
National Register of Historic Places in Ravalli County, Montana
Houses completed in 1930
American Craftsman architecture in Montana
Houses on the National Register of Historic Places in Montana
1930 establishments in Montana
Houses in Ravalli County, Montana
Hamilton, Montana
Log buildings and structures on the National Register of Historic Places in Montana